Ravichandran (30 March 1942 – 25 July 2011) was a Malaysian Indian actor who played lead hero roles in Tamil films from 1964 to 1979. He has also acted in supporting roles from 1986, and directed a few films.

He was given the title of "Kalaingnar Thilagham" in many of the on-screen credits of films starring him in the lead role. He was also called "Puratchi Kalaignar" (Refer: Anandha Bairavi Tamil Movie Title Scene). Before entering cinema, during his studies in Trichy, he has acted in two dramas, namely, AanaiyidungalAnna and Udhaya Suriyan. After entering cinema, he has acted in two dramas, namely, Mapplley Yen Magalaik Kadhali and That Man from Poonthamallee. In the drama That man from Poonthamallee, he performed in a double role and Thirumuruga Kirupanandha Variyar, who presided over the drama in Vellore, has appreciated and awarded him the title "Nadaga Sigamani". He has also acted in a TV serial, namely, GEE Boom Ba in 1986. He has also made a Guest Role in a Hindi Movie "Nanha Farishta" with Vennira Aadai Nirmala. His dance performance in "Nanha Farista" was super and excellent. During his tenure of acting, his fans, journalists and movie-directors/producers have given many titles, viz., Kalai Ulaga Ilavarasar, Kalai Nilavu, Romantic Hero, Velli Vizha Kathanayagan, Vannap Pada Nayagan,  Evergreen Hero, Chinna MGR, Kalaignar Thilagam, Style King, Stunt Man an, Bhagdath Perazhagan, Kalai Chelvan, Pudhumai Thilagam etc. He was very affectionate with his fans.

Life 
Ravichandran is a Tamil, born B.S. Raman in Kuala Lumpur, capital of the Federated Malay States. He moved to Tiruchirappalli, India in 1951, and studied at the St. Joseph's College. He was married twice; he first married Vimala, with whom he has a daughter, Lavanya, and two sons, Balaji and Hamsavardhan. Thereafter, he married Malayalam actress Sheela, and had a son George Vishnu. After his divorce with the latter he got back to his first wife. His sons Hamsavardhan and George also took up acting as a career, with Hamsavardhan starring in the film Manthiran, directed by Ravichandran himself. Lavanya is married and has two daughters. His granddaughter Tanya Ravichandran debuted through Balle Vellaiyathevaa, playing alongside M. Sasikumar, Well known for her role in Karuppan a romantic action comedy film, in which she is playing alongside Vijay Sethupathi

Filmography

References

External links 

2011 deaths
Male actors in Tamil cinema
Tamil male actors
Malaysian people of Indian descent
Malaysian emigrants to India
Male actors in Malayalam cinema
Indian male film actors
Male actors from Tiruchirappalli
Male actors from Chennai
Place of death missing
1942 births
21st-century Indian film directors
Tamil film directors
20th-century Indian male actors
21st-century Indian male actors
People from Kuala Lumpur
Film directors from Chennai
St Joseph's College, Tiruchirappalli alumni